Quarry Hill is a hill east of Ho Man Tin near the east coast of the Kowloon Peninsula in Hong Kong where present-day Ho Man Tin (South) Estate is located. The area was once zoned as the Shek Shan Resettlement Area, above Kau Pui Lung Road and near present-day Lok Man Sun Chuen.

History
At the time of the 1911 census, the population of Shek Shan was 277. The number of males was 178.

Streets and places in Quarry Hill
Sheung Shing Street
Sheung Lok Street
Sheung Wo Street
Shing Lok House
Fat Kwong Street
Ho Man Tin Estate
Ho Man Tin (South) Estate
Ho Man Tin Plaza
One Homantin (under construction)
Mantin Heights
Celestial Heights

Education

Educational institutions in Quarry Hill include:
Chan Sui Ki (La Salle) College
Hoi Ping Chamber of Commerce Secondary School
St. Teresa Secondary School
Y.W.C.A. Hioe Tjo Yoeng College
Wa Ying College

Public services
Hong Kong Housing Authority Exhibition Centre

Community facilities
T.W.G.Hs. Wong Cho Tong Social Service Building
SAHK LOHAS Garden
Sheung Shing Street Park

Transport
Ho Man Tin Bus Terminus
Ho Man Tin station

References

 

Kowloon
Kowloon City District
Mountains, peaks and hills of Hong Kong

zh-tw:紅燈山